The Malaysia Agro Exposition Park Serdang (MAEPS) is an agro park in Sepang District, Selangor, Malaysia. It is the largest agro park in Malaysia and Asia. It was created under an initiative by the Malaysian Ministry of Agriculture to be a venue for meetings, incentives, conferences and exhibitions (MICE), especially for those catering towards the agriculture, horticulture and agrotourism field.

Geography and facilities
MAEPS is situated to the south of the Malaysian Agricultural Research and Development Institute. It is accessible via the South Klang Valley Expressway.

The buildings and outdoor spaces were designed to bring out the best of the surrounding landscape.

History
The Malaysia Agriculture, Horticulture and Agrotourism Show (MAHA) is held here once every two years. The last was held in 2018.

During the COVID-19 pandemic in Malaysia, MAEPS was converted into makeshift hospital to treat the infected patients. The hospital location is called the COVID-19 Quarantine and Low-Risk Treatment Centre. MAEPS is expected to receive its first patient with low risk one week after its conversion process is complete. It has started to operation since 23 April with 12 patients.

Events

 21 – 26 November 2006: Malaysia Agriculture, Horticulture and Agrotourism Show (MAHA 2006)
 11 – 23 August 2008: Malaysia Agriculture, Horticulture and Agrotourism Show (MAHA 2008)
 Export Furniture Exhibition, 2009
 29 November – 12 December 2010: Malaysia Agriculture, Horticulture and Agrotourism Show (MAHA 2010)
 23 November – 2 December 2012: Malaysia Agriculture, Horticulture and Agrotourism Show (MAHA 2012)
 Malaysia International Tourism Exchange, 2012
 Karnival & Ekspo Kemahiran Kebangsaan, 2013
 Urbanscapes 2013
 20 – 30 November 2014: Malaysia Agriculture, Horticulture and Agrotourism Show (MAHA 2014)
 1 – 11 December 2016: Malaysia Agriculture, Horticulture and Agrotourism Show (MAHA 2016)
 22 November – 2 December 2018: Malaysia Agriculture, Horticulture and Agrotourism Show (MAHA 2018)
 4 – 14 August 2022: Malaysia Agriculture, Horticulture and Agrotourism Show (MAHA 2022)

References

External links
 MAEPS Website

Convention centres in Malaysia
Agricultural organisations based in Malaysia
Buildings and structures in Selangor
Ministry of Agriculture and Food Industries (Malaysia)
Hospitals established for the COVID-19 pandemic
COVID-19 pandemic in Malaysia